Marcel Theunissen (born 9 June 1999) is a South African rugby union player for the  in Super Rugby. His regular position is flanker.

Theunissen was named in the  squad for the Super Rugby Unlocked competition.

References

South African rugby union players
Living people
1999 births
Rugby union flankers
Stormers players
Western Province (rugby union) players
Rugby union players from Bloemfontein